The Chicago Blackhawks are a professional ice hockey team based in Chicago, Illinois. They are members of the Central Division of the Western Conference in the National Hockey League (NHL). The club was founded in 1926 as one of the league's first American franchises, joining in the same year as the New York Rangers and the Detroit Red Wings (then known as the Detroit Cougars). Owing to the Blackhawks' long history, they are considered one of the NHL's "Original Six" teams—a term reserved for the six teams that comprised the NHL from the 1942–43 season until the league expanded in 1967. As of October 9, 2020, 955 players have played at least one game for the franchise, either in the NHL regular season or in the playoffs.

The Blackhawks, known as the Black Hawks from their inception until 1986, have won the Stanley Cup six times in their 83-year history. Charlie Gardiner, the team's goaltender for its first Stanley Cup win in 1934, became the first European-born captain—and still the only goaltender captain—to win the Stanley Cup. Johnny Gottselig became the second European-born captain to do so when the team won its second championship in 1938. Stan Mikita is the franchise leader in assists (926) and points (1467), and Bobby Hull is the leader in goals (604). Chris Chelios is the franchise leader in penalty minutes (1495). Goaltender Tony Esposito is the club's all-time leader in wins (418) and shutouts (74).

The franchise has had 34 players selected as captains. Each NHL team may select a captain, who has the "sole privilege of discussing with the referee any questions relating to interpretation of rules which may arise during the progress of a game". Dick Irvin was named the first captain in 1926. The current captain, Jonathan Toews, was the third-youngest captain in NHL history at the time of his selection.

Key
 Won Stanley Cup while with the Blackhawks.
 Appeared in a Blackhawks game during the 2021–22 season.

Goaltenders

Skaters

Notes
 Save percentage did not become an official NHL statistic until the 1982–83 season.  Therefore, goaltenders who played before 1982 do not have official save percentages.
 The seasons column lists the first year of the season of the player's first game and the last year of the season of the player's last game. For example, a player who played one game in the 2000–2001 NHL season would be listed as playing with the team from 2000 to 2001, regardless of what calendar year the game occurred within.
 Moe Roberts, an assistant trainer for the team at the time, played twenty minutes after a knee injury forced Harry Lumley out of a game.

References
General

Specific

 
players
Chicago Blackhawks players